Néji Jalloul is a Tunisian politician. He served as Minister of Education in the cabinet of Prime Minister Habib Essid and he continued to serve in this position in the cabinet of Prime Minister Youssef Chahed.

He was a candidate in the 2019 Tunisian presidential election.

References 

Living people
Year of birth missing (living people)
Place of birth missing (living people)
21st-century Tunisian politicians
Government ministers of Tunisia
Candidates for President of Tunisia